Carl Sandblom (21 August 1908 – 1 June 1984) was a Swedish sailor who competed in the 1928 Summer Olympics.

In 1928, he was a crew member of the Swedish boat Sylvia which won the bronze medal in the 8 metre class.

External links
profile

1908 births
1984 deaths
Swedish male sailors (sport)
Olympic sailors of Sweden
Sailors at the 1928 Summer Olympics – 8 Metre
Olympic bronze medalists for Sweden
Olympic medalists in sailing
Medalists at the 1928 Summer Olympics